Richard Field Conover  (November 20, 1858 – June 5, 1930) was an American tennis player, lawyer and real estate manager.

Life 
Conover was born in South Amboy, New Jersey the son of Francis Stevens Conover and Helen Stockton Field. He was a grandson of Richard Stockton, a signer of the Declaration of Independence.

As a tennis player, Conover took part in the first stagings of the US Championships in between 1881 and 1884. In 1883 he reached the semifinals which he lost to James Dwight.

After graduating from Princeton University and Columbia Law School, he practiced law at Newark for a short while before moving to Texas where he engaged in ranching. Conover there met his wife, Cornelia Fitzhugh, whom he married on September 11, 1895. They had three children: Carroll Fitzhugh Conover (b. circa June 1896), Helen Field Conover (b. 21 March 1898) and Alida Van Rensselaer Conover (b. 6 February 1900).

In 1900, Conover moved to Bay City, Michigan where he concentrated on managing his wife's real estates in Bay County.

In the 1920s, he lived at New Port Richey, Florida. He died on June 5, 1930 at Charleston, South Carolina at age 71.

References 
 

1858 births
1930 deaths
19th-century American people
19th-century male tennis players
American male tennis players
Columbia Law School alumni
People from South Amboy, New Jersey
Princeton University alumni
People from New Port Richey, Florida
Tennis people from New Jersey